Auburn Alehouse is a brewery and restaurant located in the Old Town neighborhood of Auburn, California in the United States.

History

Auburn Alehouse was co-founded by Brian and Lisa Ford. Brian Ford started making beer by homebrewing. Ford then took classes through the American Brewers Guild in fermentation science and engineering. Ford interned at Rubicon Brewing Company. He opened Crawford Brewing Company in 1997. The brewery relocated to Nevada City, California and was renamed Stonehouse. He quit working there in 1999 and Beermann's in Roseville, California. He also opened their location in Lincoln, California. He quit working for that company in 2003. He started working in construction. He had intentions to open another brewery and worked on the plans for Auburn Alehouse, which opened in 2007. The brewery also has a restaurant.

The brewery and restaurant are located in the American Block Building, which was the Shanghai Restaurant prior to becoming a brewery. When it was the Shanghai, portions of the movie Phenomenon were filmed there. The restaurant serves pub food. It has been featured in the Placer Herald, The Union, KTXL and Sacramento.

Beer

In 2013, Auburn Alehouse produced 1,870 barrels of beer. They make a Pilsner which Ford calls a "Pre-Prohibition style Pilsner". They make a seasonal barley wine, called Old Prospector, that uses wine from Dono dal Cielo.

Awards

References

Gastropubs in California
Buildings and structures in Placer County, California
Companies based in Placer County, California
Restaurants established in 2007
2007 establishments in California
Beer brewing companies based in California